Amphisbaena hoogmoedi is a species of worm lizard in the family Amphisbaenidae. The species is endemic to  Brazil.

Etymology
The specific name, hoogmoedi, is in honor of Dutch herpetologist Marinus Steven Hoogmoed.

Geographic range
A. hoogmoedi is found in the state of Pará, Brazil.

Description

References

Further reading
Oliveira, Elaine C.S.; Vaz-Silva, Wilian; Santos, Alfredo P., Jr.; Graboski, Roberta; Teixeira, Mauro, Jr.; Dal Vechio, Francisco; Ribeiro Síria (2018). "A new four-pored Amphisbaena Linnaeus, 1758 (Amphisbaenia, Amphisbaenidae) from Brazilian Amazon". Zootaxa 4420 (4): 451–474. (Amphisbaena hoogmoedi, new species).

hoogmoedi
Reptiles described in 2018
Taxa named by Elaine C.S. Oliveira
Taxa named by Wilian Vaz-Silva
Taxa named by Alfredo P. Santos Jr.
Taxa named by Roberta Graboski
Taxa named by Mauro Teixeira Jr.
Taxa named by Francisco Dal Vechio
Taxa named by Síria Ribeiro
Endemic fauna of Brazil
Reptiles of Brazil